Corporal John A. Falconer (1844 to April 1, 1900) was an American soldier who fought in the American Civil War. Falconer received the country's highest award for bravery during combat, the Medal of Honor, for his action during the Siege of Knoxville at Fort Sanders in Tennessee on 20 November 1863. He was honored with the award on 27 July 1896.

Biography
Falconer was born in Washtenaw, Michigan in 1844. He enlisted into the 17th Michigan Infantry. He died on 1 April 1900 and his remains are interred at the Sunset Hill Cemetery in Warrensburg, Missouri.

Medal of Honor citation

See also

List of American Civil War Medal of Honor recipients: A–F

References

1844 births
1900 deaths
People of Michigan in the American Civil War
Union Army officers
United States Army Medal of Honor recipients
American Civil War recipients of the Medal of Honor